Bénévent, French word for Benevento, may refer to several places:

France
Bénévent-et-Charbillac, a commune of the Hautes-Alpes department
Bénévent-l'Abbaye, a commune of the Creuse department
Nossage-et-Bénévent, a commune Hautes-Alpes department
Bénévent-Grand-Bourg, a communauté de communes of the Creuse department
Canton of Bénévent-l'Abbaye, a canton of the Creuse department

Italy
Benevento, a town seat of the homonymous province 
Witches of Benevento, an alleged group of witches who lived in Benevento, Italy
Province of Benevento, a province of Campania region
Duchy of Benevento (later the Principality of Benevento) a medieval duchy which formed the southern part of the former Lombard Kingdom of Italy and later became a de facto independent rump state
Serie A side Benevento Calcio.